Purachet Thodsanit (born 9 May 2001) is a Thai professional footballer who plays as a winger or an attacking midfielder for Thai League 1 club Muangthong United.

International goals

References

External links
P. Thodsanit, Soccerway.

Purachet Thodsanit
Purachet Thodsanit
Association football midfielders
2001 births
Living people
Purachet Thodsanit